Yuet Yan is one of the 39 constituencies in the Yuen Long District of Hong Kong.

The constituency returns one district councillor to the Yuen Long District Council, with an election every four years. Yuet Yan constituency is loosely based on part of Tin Yan Estate and Tin Yuet Estate in Tin Shui Wai with estimated population of 18,671.

Councillors represented

Election results

2010s

References

Tin Shui Wai
Constituencies of Hong Kong
Constituencies of Yuen Long District Council
2003 establishments in Hong Kong
Constituencies established in 2003